Joey Patrick San Nicolas is a politician in the Commonwealth of the Northern Mariana Islands (CNMI) who served as Mayor of Tinian. He previously served as Attorney General.

Career
On Tuesday, October 23, 2012, San Nicolas was nominated as the Attorney General, and appointed in an acting capacity, by Governor Benigno Fitial. On Friday, November 16, 2012, he was unanimously confirmed by the CNMI Senate on his native Tinian and sworn in later that day. He succeeded acting Attorney General Ellsbeth Viola Alepuyo, who was appointed on Monday, August 13, 2012 after Edward Buckingham fled the island in scandal. San Nicolas resigned effective Saturday, July 5, 2014, to run for Mayor of Tinian.  He was succeeded by Deputy Attorney General Gilbert Joseph Birnbrich.

References

Living people
Attorneys General of the Northern Mariana Islands
Northern Mariana Islands lawyers
American lawyers
Mayors of places in the Northern Mariana Islands
1973 births